Helmut Weise is a East German retired slalom canoeist who competed in the mid-1950s. He won a silver medal in the C-2 team event at the 1955 ICF Canoe Slalom World Championships in Tacen.

References

German male canoeists
Possibly living people
Year of birth missing
Medalists at the ICF Canoe Slalom World Championships